Quicksand is a 2003 direct-to-video British-French-German co-produced crime thriller film starring Michael Keaton and Michael Caine. The film was released in Germany, Finland, Sweden and Norway in 2003, in United States on 16 March 2004 and in the United Kingdom on 1 November 2004. Quicksand was filmed in South France between December 2000 and January 2001, originally set for a 2002 release.

Plot 
Martin Raikes is an American bank investigator who is sent to Monaco to check up on the suspicious financial dealings of a movie production. After the business trip, Martin, who is divorced, will fly to London to visit his daughter.

Martin is met by the film company's CFO, Lela Forin, who introduces him to the movie's leading man, washed-up action star Jake Mellows.

Something is rotten with the production, though, and Martin senses it. Unfortunately, he sticks his nose in a little too deep for the corrupt bankrollers' tastes, and is soon deemed a threat. Martin is first offered a mega-bribe, but he rejects it. As it turns out, the bankrollers are Russian mafia, led by Oleg Butraskaya.

Martin suddenly finds himself framed for an assassination attempt, and the hostile authorities—on the payroll of the mob—want to kill him. American authorities are also hot on his trail, investigating him for money laundering, among other false charges.

As Martin sifts through the mystery, he reveals the nefarious nature of Oleg's rackets, which include illegal pornography, kidnapping and money laundering. Not knowing whom to trust, he turns to Lela, but soon, she, too, is marked for death. Jake, who has gambling debts, is persuaded by Oleg to speak lines for the film that are actually used to make Martin believe the actor is holding Martin's daughter captive.

After a fight between them, Martin and Jake join forces with Lela to stage an illusion during which Oleg incriminates himself to the law. Lela develops a new film project for Jake and a personal interest in Martin.

Cast 

 Michael Keaton as Martin Raikes
 Michael Caine as Jake Mellows
 Judith Godreche as Lela Forin
 Rade Šerbedžija as Oleg Butraskaya
 Matthew Marsh as Michel Cote
 Xander Berkeley as Joey Patterson
 Kathleen Wilhoite as Beth Ann
 Rachel Ferjani as Rachel
 Elina Löwensohn as Vannessa
 Clare Thomas as Emma
 Hermione Norris as Sarah
 William Beck as Nicoli
 Jean-Yves Berteloot as Vincent Deschamps
 Jean-Pierre Castaldi as Jean Pillon
 Colin Stinton as Harbinson
 Bogdan E. Stanoevitch as Oleg's Driver
 Paul O'Boyle as Close Cropped Man
 Patrick Mazet as Detective
 Paul Birchard as F.B.I. Man
 Bob Friend as Newscaster
 Sabrina Mongin as Nina
 Axelle Behary as Tasha
 Stéphane Lévêque as Desk Clerk
 Jake Broder as Technician
 Serge Soric as Scene Shifter Driver
 Ivan Marevich as Scene Shifter Driver's Mate
 Simon Smith as Mikhail
 Herve Candy as First Slavic Girl
 Aurelie Attyasse as Second Slavic Girl
 Sebastian Barrio as First French Man
 Pascal Saint-James as Second French Man
 Stephan Chrisz as Second French Man (Look Alike)
 Didier Casnati (uncredited) as himself

Release 
Quicksand was released in Germany, Finland, Sweden and Norway on 13 May 2003, in the United States on 16 March 2004 and in the United Kingdom on 1 November 2004.

Filming 
Quicksand was filmed in South France between December 2000 and January 2001, originally set for a 2002 release.

References

External links
 
 
 

2003 films
2003 crime thriller films
2003 direct-to-video films
2000s English-language films
American crime thriller films
Artisan Entertainment films
British chase films
British crime thriller films
Direct-to-video crime films
Direct-to-video thriller films
English-language French films
English-language German films
Films scored by Anthony Marinelli
Films about kidnapping
Films about assassinations
Films about filmmaking
Films about miscarriage of justice
Films directed by John Mackenzie (film director)
Films set in France
Films set in Monaco
French crime thriller films
German crime thriller films
2000s American films
2000s British films
2000s French films
2000s German films